The Arrondissement of La Louvière is one of the seven administrative arrondissements in the Walloon province of Hainaut, Belgium. The Arrondissement of La Louvière was created in 2019 from the municipalities of La Louvière (formerly from Arrondissement of Soignies) and Binche, Estinnes, Morlanwelz (formerly from Arrondissement of Thuin).

References

La Louviere